The Adam of Macedonia, earlier often referred to as the Adam of Govrlevo, is a neolithic sculpture found by archaeologist Milos Bilbija of the Skopje City Museum where it now resides.

Description 
More than 7,000 years old, it is the oldest artwork and artifact found in the Republic of North Macedonia. Dating from the 6th millennium BC, the sculpture's creator represented a sitting male body, and showed details in the spine, ribs and navel, and erect phallus.

See also 
 List of Stone Age art
 Art of the Upper Paleolithic
 Cerje, Skopje
 Kokino
 Tumba Madžari

References

External links 	
Radio-isotopic Age Examination of Adam in Kill, Germany 	 	 

6th-millennium BC works
Prehistory of North Macedonia
Neolithic
Prehistoric sculpture
Sopište Municipality